John Strachan (1862–1907) was a scholar of Sanskrit, Ancient Greek and the Celtic languages. He was a professor at Owens College and the Victoria University of Manchester. He is best remembered for the Thesaurus Palaeohibernicus, a collection of material in Old Irish that he edited together with Whitley Stokes, and for the textbook Old Irish Paradigms and Selections from the Old Irish Glosses, first published in 1904–05 and later revised by Osborn Bergin. Both of these works are still in print.

References

External links

Researchers and writers on Irish

 

1862 births
1907 deaths
Celtic studies scholars
British philologists
British Sanskrit scholars
British Indologists